Stephen Wilson (born 30 March 1971) is a retired British boxer. He competed in the men's light heavyweight event at the 1992 Summer Olympics.

Wilson won the 1990 Amateur Boxing Association British middleweight title, when boxing out of the Haddington ABC.

References

External links
 

1971 births
Living people
British male boxers
Olympic boxers of Great Britain
Boxers at the 1992 Summer Olympics
Boxers from Edinburgh
Light-heavyweight boxers